Ciucani may refer to several villages in Romania:

 Ciucani, a village in Răcăciuni Commune, Bacău County
 Ciucani, a village in Sânmartin, Harghita